Westhill Academy is an Aberdeenshire Council secondary school in Westhill, near Aberdeen, Scotland, serving the Westhill, Elrick and Skene areas of Aberdeenshire as well as some students from Kingswells. Its main feeder schools are Westhill Primary, Crombie Primary School, Elrick Primary, Skene Primary and Kingswells Primary. School transport, before and after school, is provided for students who live in Skene. Pupils from nearby Kingswells, which is in the neighbouring Aberdeen City council area, are at liberty to use the regular bus services which exist between the two towns.

Westhill Academy opened in the autumn of 1979 with buildings designed to accommodate 500 pupils. The school was extended in 1982 and then again in 1996 raising the capacity of the school to 1000 pupils. The roll of the school, in recent years, has fluctuated between 890 and 1200 pupils. In 2019 the school celebrated its 40th anniversary. It was celebrated by inviting current and ex staff members to look at year books and to see how it has changed through the years.

There has been much talk about expanding the school yet again or even building a new school elsewhere in Westhill due to the town's rising population but no plans have been made official. The 2014 local development plan estimated that the school would be at 91% capacity by 2016.

Notable former pupils 

Tim Baillie, Slalom Canoer
Jack Grimmer, Footballer
George Hunter, Rugby Player
Stuart MacBride, Author
Amy Manson, Actress
 Ross Forbes, Scotland Lawn Bowls International

References

External links
 

Secondary schools in Aberdeenshire
Educational institutions established in 1979
1979 establishments in Scotland
Westhill, Aberdeenshire